Live and Acoustic or Live & Acoustic may refer to:
 Live and Acoustic (Rivermaya album)
 Live and Acoustic (Ray Wilson album)
 Live and Acoustic (EP), a 1994 EP by Harem Scarem
 Live & Acoustic (Latch Key Kid album), 2009
 Live & Acoustic (Missy Higgins album), 2005
 Live & Acoustic (Sarah McLeod album), 2006
 Live & Acoustic (Vika and Linda album), 2000

See also
 Live Acoustic (disambiguation)